Kotov and Kotova (feminine) is a Russian surname. Notable people with the surname include:

 Alexander Kotov (1913–1981), a Soviet chess grandmaster and author
 Konstantin Kotov (footballer) (b. 1998), a Russian footballer
 Konstantin Kotov (activist) (b. 1985), a Russian political activist
 Oleg Kotov (b. 1965), a Russian cosmonaut
 Sergei Kotov (b. 1985), an Israeli figure skater
 Sergei Kotov (footballer) (b. 1982), a Russian professional footballer
 Vladimir Kotov (b. 1958), a South African long distance runner
 Nina Kotova (b. 1969), a Russian American cellist and composer
 Tatyana Kotova (b. 1976), a Russian long jump athlete
 Tatiana Kotova (b. 1985), the winner of Miss Russia 2006 title

Russian-language surnames